Kevin Easton (7 October 1932 – 17 June 2012) was an Australian rules footballer who played with North Melbourne in the Victorian Football League (VFL).

Notes

External links 

2012 deaths
1932 births
Australian rules footballers from Victoria (Australia)
North Melbourne Football Club players